Ahmed Subhi (born 1 January 1955) is a former Iraqi football striker who played for Iraq in the 1976 AFC Asian Cup. He played for the national team between 1974 and 1978 and scored 15 goals. At the club level, he played for Al-Baladiyat, scoring 4 goals in the 1976–77 Iraqi National League season.

Career statistics

International goals

Scores and results list Iraq's goal tally first.

References

1955 births
Iraqi footballers
Iraq international footballers
1976 AFC Asian Cup players
Footballers at the 1978 Asian Games
Amanat Baghdad players
Living people
Association football forwards
Asian Games competitors for Iraq